Stefán Jónsson (born 19 January 1918, date of death unknown) was an Icelandic water polo player. He competed in the men's tournament at the 1936 Summer Olympics.

References

1918 births
Year of death missing
Icelandic male water polo players
Olympic water polo players of Iceland
Water polo players at the 1936 Summer Olympics
Place of birth missing